Saragah (also Romanized as Sarāgāh) is a village in Saheli-ye Jokandan Rural District, in the Central District of Talesh County, Gilan Province, Iran. At the 2006 census, its population was 847, in 193 families. The Saragah Lake is located by this village.

Language 
Linguistic composition of the village.

References

Populated places in Talesh County

Azerbaijani settlements in Gilan Province

Talysh settlements in Gilan Province